Timbédra is a commune and town in the Hodh Ech Chargui Region of south-eastern Mauritania.

Transport
The town is served by Timbedra Airport and Dahara Airport.

Communes of Mauritania